Villacañas is a surname. Notable people with the surname include:

Beatriz Villacañas (born 1964), Spanish poet, essayist, and literary critic, daughter of Juan
José Luis Villacañas (born 1955), Spanish political philosopher and historian
Juan Antonio Villacañas (1922–2001), Spanish poet, essayist, and literary critic